The Catholic Church in Pakistan comprises only a Latin hierarchy, joint in the national Episcopal Conference of Pakistan (Catholic Bishops' Conference of Pakistan), composed of 
 two Ecclesiastical provinces, each headed by a Metropolitan Archbishop, with a total of four suffragan dioceses 
 a pre-diocesan Apostolic vicariate, which is exempt.

There is also an Apostolic Nunciature to Pakistan as papal diplomatic representation (embassy-level) in Lahore.

In Afghanistan there is only a pre-diocesan independent mission.

The Islamic republic accredits no papal diplomat.

There are no Eastern Catholic or other quasi-diocesan jurisdictions in either country.

There are no titular sees and all defunct jurisdictions have current Latin successor sees.

Current Latin jurisdictions

Exempt : directly Subject to the Holy See 
both pre-diocesan
 Apostolic Vicariate of Quetta (Pakistan) (2001)
 Mission Sui Iuris of Afghanistan covering the whole country (2002)

Ecclesiastical Province of Karachi (Pakistan) 
 Metropolitan Archdiocese of Karachi (1948; archdiocese 1950)
Roman Catholic Diocese of Hyderabad (in Pakistan) (1958)

Ecclesiastical Province of Lahore (Pakistan) 
 Metropolitan Archdiocese of Lahore (1880; diocese 1886; archdiocese 1994)
Roman Catholic Diocese of Faisalabad (1960)
 Roman Catholic Diocese of Islamabad-Rawalpindi (1887; diocese 1947)
 Roman Catholic Diocese of Multan (1936; diocese 1939)

See also 
 List of Catholic dioceses (structured view)
 Catholic Church in Pakistan
 Catholic Church in Afghanistan

Sources and external links 
 GCatholic.org Pakistan - data for all sections.
 GCatholic.org Afghanistan - data for all sections.
 Catholic-Hierarchy Pakistan.

Pakistan
Catholic dioceses
Catholic dioceses